Selected Letters V (1934-1937) is a collection of letters by H. P. Lovecraft. It was released in 1976 by Arkham House in an edition of 5,138 copies.  It is the fifth of a five volume series of collections of Lovecraft's letters and includes a preface by James Turner.

Contents

Selected Letters V (1934-1937) includes letters to:

 Robert Bloch
 Duane Rimel
 F. Lee Baldwin
 R.H. Barlow
 Emil Petaja
 Henry Kuttner
 Richard F. Searight
 C.L. Moore
 Kenneth Sterling
 Willis Conover

References

1976 non-fiction books
Arkham House books
Books published posthumously
Collections of letters
Non-fiction books by H. P. Lovecraft